6376 Schamp, provisional designation , is a stony background asteroid from the central regions of the asteroid belt, approximately  in diameter. It was discovered on 29 May 1987, by American astronomer couple Carolyn and Eugene Shoemaker at the Palomar Observatory in California. The S-type asteroid has a rotation period of 6.6 hours. It was named after  who took care of the Shoemaker family after Eugene's fatal car accident in Australia.

Orbit and classification 

Schamp is a non-family asteroid from the main belt's background population. It orbits the Sun in the central main-belt at a distance of 1.9–3.2 AU once every 4 years and 2 months (1,509 days; semi-major axis of 2.58 AU). Its orbit has an eccentricity of 0.25 and an inclination of 16° with respect to the ecliptic.

Physical characteristics 

Schamp has been characterized as a common, stony S-type asteroid by Pan-STARRS survey and in the SDSS-based taxonomy.

Rotation period 

In July 2012, two rotational lightcurves of Schamp were obtained from photometric observations by Petr Pravec and Robert Stephens. Lightcurve analysis gave a well-defined rotation period of 6.6093 and 6.613 hours with an identical brightness amplitude of 0.16 magnitude.

Diameter and albedo 

According to the survey carried out by the NEOWISE mission of NASA's Wide-field Infrared Survey Explorer, Schamp measures 7.924 kilometers in diameter and its surface has an albedo of 0.213, while the Collaborative Asteroid Lightcurve Link assumes a standard albedo for a stony asteroid of 0.20 and calculates a diameter of 8.18 kilometers based on an absolute magnitude of 12.8.

Naming 

This minor planet was named after Americans stationed in Alice Springs, Larry and Becky Schamp, who cared for members of the Shoemaker family after an automobile accident in which Eugene Shoemaker died in 1997. The official naming citation was published by the Minor Planet Center on 11 April 1998.

Notes

References

External links 
 Asteroid Lightcurve Database (LCDB), query form (info )
 Dictionary of Minor Planet Names, Google books
 Discovery Circumstances: Numbered Minor Planets (5001)-(10000) – Minor Planet Center
 
 

006376
Discoveries by Eugene Merle Shoemaker
Discoveries by Carolyn S. Shoemaker
Named minor planets
19870529